The following is a list of endorheic basins, watersheds which do not drain to the sea.

Africa
 Chott Melrhir (Algeria)
 Chott Ech Chergui (Algeria)
 Chott el Hodna (Algeria)
 Tidikelt Depression (Algeria)
 Sebkha Azzel Matti
 Sebhka Mekerrhane
 Tunisian salt lakes (Tunisia)
 Chott el Djerid
 Chott el Gharsa
 Qattara Depression (Egypt)
 Siwa Depression (Egypt)
 Lake Chad Basin (Cameroon, Chad, Niger, Nigeria)
 Western Equatorial Crater Lakes (Cameroon)
 Lake Barombi Koto
 Lake Barombi Mbo
 Lake Bermin
 Lake Benakouma
 Lake Dissoni/Soden
 Lake Mboandong
 Makgadikgadi Pans (Botswana)
 Northern Eastern Rift (Djibouti, Eritrea, Ethiopia)
 Afar Depression (Djibouti, Eritrea, Ethiopia)
 Ethiopian Rift Valley lakes (Ethiopia)
 Lake Chew Bahir, Ethiopia, Kenya
 Chalbi Desert, Kenya, Ethiopia
 Lake Logipi-Suguta Valley (Kenya)
 Lake Turkana Basin (Ethiopia, Kenya)
 Southern Eastern Rift (Kenya, Tanzania)
 Lake Baringo (Kenya)
 Lake Bogoria (Kenya)
 Lake Nakuru (Kenya)
 Lake Elmenteita (Kenya)
 Lake Naivasha (Kenya)
 Lake Magadi (Kenya)
 Lake Natron (Tanzania)
 Lake Eyasi (Tanzania)
 Lake Barangida (Tanzania)
 Lake Singida (Tanzania)
 Lake Sulunga (Tanzania)
 Lake Rukwa (Tanzania)
 Lake Chilwa (Malawi)
 Lake Chiuta (Malawi, Mozambique)
 Etosha Basin (Angola, Namibia)
 Okavango Basin (Angola, Botswana, Namibia, Zimbabwe)

Antarctica
 Lake Vanda
 Lake Vida

Australia

 Lake Eyre Basin (Queensland, New South Wales, Northern Territory, South Australia), which drains into the highly variable Lake Eyre and includes Lake Frome.
 Lake Gairdner (South Australia)
 Lake Torrens (South Australia)
 Lake Corangamite (western Victoria)
 Lake George (New South Wales), formerly connected to the Murray-Darling Basin.
 Bulloo-Bancannia drainage basin (New South Wales)

Eurasia
 Caspian Sea Basin (Armenia, Azerbaijan, Georgia, Iran, Kazakhstan, Russia, Turkey, Turkmenistan) including the Volga River.
 Aral Sea Basin (Afghanistan, Kyrgyzstan, Kazakhstan, Tajikistan, Turkmenistan, Uzbekistan) including the Syr Darya and Amu Darya rivers.
 Lake Balkhash Basin (China, Kazakhstan)
 Emin Valley (China, Kazakhstan)
 Lake Alakol
 Issyk-Kul, Son-Kul and Chatyr-Kul lakes (Kyrgyzstan)
 Dzungarian Basin (China)
 Ulungur Lake
 Ebinur Lake
 Manas Lake
 Ailik Lake
 Uvs Nuur basin (Mongolia, Russia)
 Great Lakes Depression (Mongolia, Russia)
 Khyargas-Nurr Lake
 Khar-Us Lake
Khar Lake
 Tarim Basin (China)
 Lop Nur
 Gobi Desert (China, Mongolia)
 Hulun Lake (China, Mongolia), sometimes overflows into the Argun River, a tributary of the Amur
 Tibetan Plateau (China)
 Nam Lake
 Siling Lake
 Tangra Lake
 Ngangze Lake
 Taro Lake
 Ngangla Ringco
 Zhari Namco
 Dagze Lake
 Dogai Coring Lake
 Qinghai Lake (China)
 Qaidam Basin (China)
 Kumkol Basin (between the Altyn-Tagh and the Kunlun)
 Torey Lakes (Russia)
 Turpan Depression (China)
 Sistan Basin (Afghanistan, Iran, Pakistan)
 Hamun-e Mashkid (Iran, Pakistan)
 Hari River, Afghanistan (Tedzhen River) (Afghanistan, Iran, Turkmenistan)
 Murgab River (Afghanistan, Turkmenistan)
 Iranian Plateau (Iran)
Bejestan
Dasht-e Kavir
Dasht-e Lut
Zayande River
Hamun-e Jaz Murian
Kor River (Kor Rud)
Lake Maharlu 
Namak Lake
Sirjan
Yazd
 Lake Urmia (Iran)
 Lake Van (Turkey)
 Central Anatolian lake basins (Turkey)
 Lake Tuz
 Lake Beyşehir
 Lake Eğirdir
 Lake Burdur
 Lake Acıgöl
 Syrian Desert Basins (Syria, Jordan, Iraq, Saudi Arabia)
 Sabkhat al Muh (Syria)
 Buhayrat al 'Utaybah (Syria)
 Arabian Peninsula (Saudi Arabia, Iraq, Jordan, United Arab Emirates, Oman, Yemen)
 Wadi al-Rummah
 Wadi Dawasir
 Rub' al Khali
 Arabian Desert
 pluvial Sea of Galilee and Dead Sea Basins (Israel, Jordan, Lebanon, Palestinian Territories, Syria)
 (India)
 Sambhar Lake (India)
 Tso Kar (India)
 Tso Moriri (India)
 Pangong Tso (India)
 Neusiedlersee (Austria)
 Lake Trasimeno (Italy) -- cryptorheic
 Laguna de Gallocanta (Spain)
 Estany de Banyoles (Spain)
 The Lasithi Plateau in Crete, Greece -- cryptorheic
 Lake Chany, Russia

North America
 Endorheic basins in the Great Plains
 Quill Lakes, Lenore Lake, and Basin Lake (Saskatchewan)
 Missouri Coteau-Old Wives Lake (Saskatchewan)
 Great Sand Hills-Crane Lake and Bigstick Lake (Saskatchewan)
 Pakowki Lake (Alberta)
 Skeleton Lake (Alberta)
 Manitou, Tramping, Buffalo, and Sullivan lakes (Alberta, Saskatchewan)
 Little Manitou Lake (Saskatchewan)
 Devils Lake (North Dakota)
 Coteau des Prairies (mostly South Dakota)
 The Sandhills (Nebraska)
 White Woman Basin (Kansas)
 Devil's Lake (Wisconsin) -- cryptorheic
 Great Divide Basin (Wyoming)
 San Luis Closed Basin (Colorado)
 Crater Lake (Oregon) -- cryptorheic 
 Great Basin (California, Idaho, Nevada, Oregon, Utah and Wyoming) 
 Oregon Lakes (California, Oregon)
 Harney Basin (Harney and Malheur lakes) (Oregon)
 Alvord Lake (Oregon)
 Goose Lake (California, Oregon)
 Summer and Silver lakes (Oregon)
  North Lahontan Basin (California, Nevada, Oregon), a system of endorheic sub-basins connected with pluvial Lake Lahontan
 Pyramid Lake (a remnant of Lake Lahontan) fed by Truckee River-Lake Tahoe (California, Nevada)
 Honey Lake-Eagle Lake (California)
 Walker Lake (another remnant of Lake Lahontan) fed by Walker River (California, Nevada)
 Black Rock Desert (Nevada)
 Carson Sink – Carson River (Nevada)
 Humboldt Sink – Humboldt River (Nevada)
 Quinn River (Nevada)
 Bonneville Basin (Idaho, Nevada, Utah, Wyoming), a system of endorheic basins connected to pluvial Lake Bonneville
 Great Salt Lake (remnant of Lake Bonneville) in Utah
 Sevier Lake (Utah)
 Utah Lake – Jordan River
 South Lahontan Basin (California, Nevada), draining into pluvial Lake Manly in Death Valley
 Amargosa River-Badwater Basin (California, Nevada)
 Mono Basin/Lake, Owens River/Lake, China Lake, Searles Valley/Lake, Panamint Valley (California, Nevada)
 Rogers and Rosamond Lakes (California)
 pluvial Lake Mojave (Silver Lake and Soda Lake, California)
 Mojave River (California)
 Danby Lake, Cadiz Lake, Bristol Lake
 Central Nevada basins separate from the Bonneville and Lahontan systems
 Groom Dry Lake (Nevada)
 Disjunct Colorado River tributaries
 pluvial Lake Cahuilla and Salton Sea (California, Baja California)
 Eldorado Valley-Pahrump Valley (California, Nevada)
 Willcox Playa (Arizona)
 Zuni Salt Lake (New Mexico)
 Tularosa Basin (New Mexico, Texas)
Guzmán Basin (Chihuahua, Mexico, southwestern New Mexico)
Bolsón de Mapimí (Chihuahua, Coahuila, Durango, and Zacatecas, Mexico)
Llanos el Salado (Coahuila, Nuevo León, San Luis Potosí, Tamaulipas, and Zacatecas, Mexico)
Valley of Mexico (Federal District, Hidalgo, Mexico, and Tlaxcala, Mexico)
Oriental Basin (Puebla, Tlaxcala, and Veracruz, Mexico)
Lake Pátzcuaro (Michoacan, Mexico)
Lake Cuitzeo (Michoacan, Mexico)
Lago de Atitlán (Guatemala)
Frame Lake, Yellowknife, Northwest Territories, Canada

South America
Altiplano Basin (Argentina, Bolivia, Chile, Peru) includes Lake Titicaca, Lake Poopo, and the Salar de Uyuni.
Lake Valencia (Venezuela)
Desagues de los Colorados (northeastern Argentina)
Dulce River (Argentina)-Laguna de Mar Chiquita (north-central Argentina)
Northwest Pampas Basins (Dry Pampas of central Argentina)
Southwest Pampas Basins (Dry Pampas of central Argentina)
Meseta Somuncura (Patagonia region of southern Argentina)

Islands
 Cul-de-Sac Depression and Lago Enriquillo, on Hispaniola Island.
 Buada Lagoon, Nauru
 Kauhakō Crater, Molokai, Hawaii
 Lake Waiau, Hawaii (at low levels)
 Sutton Salt Lake, New Zealand's South Island

Ancient
Some of Earth's ancient endorheic systems include:

 The Black Sea, until its merger with the Mediterranean
 The Mediterranean Sea and all its tributary basins, during its Messinian desiccation (5 mya approximately) as it became disconnected from the Atlantic Ocean.
 Ebro and Duero basins, draining most of northern Spain during the Neogene and perhaps Pliocene.
 Lake Tanganyika in Africa. Currently at an overflow level and therefore draining into the sea via the Lukuga River, but the lake level has been lower in the past, possibly as recently as 1800.
 Tularosa Basin and Lake Cabeza de Vaca in North America. Basin formerly much larger than at present, including the ancestral Rio Grande north of Texas, feeding a large lake area.

References

 Africa
 Thieme, Michelle L. (2005). Freshwater Ecoregions of Africa and Madagascar: A Conservation Assessment. Island Press, Washington DC. pages 24–25.
 "Cameroon Crater Lakes", World Wildlife Fund 
 Australia
 Eurasia
 "Freshwater Fishes of Iran: Drainage Basins" 
 North America
  "Watersheds" map in the North American Atlas 
 Ricketts, Taylor H., Eric Dinerstein, David M. Olson, Colby J. Loucks, et al. (1999). Terrestrial Ecoregions of North America: a Conservation Assessment. Island Press, Washington DC. pages 26–29.
 South America
 Olson, D., Dinerstein, E., Canevari, P., Davidson, I., Castro, G., Morisset, V., Abell, R., and Toledo, E.; eds. (1998). Freshwater Biodiversity of Latin America and the Caribbean: A Conservation Assessment. Biodiversity Support Program, Washington DC., pages xiv–xv, 24–26.

Endorheic basins